Maie Kalda (19 June 1929 – 8 November 2013) was an Estonian literary scholar and critic.

Kalda was born in Väike-Maarja. In 1956 she graduated from Tartu State University in Estonian philology. Since 1956 she worked at Estonian SSR Academy of Sciences' Institute of Language and Literature, and its successor Under and Tuglas Literature Centre. In 1980, she was one of the signatories of the Letter of 40 intellectuals.

In 2001 he was awarded with Order of the White Star, IV class.

Works

 "History of Estonian Literature" (1965-1991). One of the authors
 monograph "Debora ja vennad". Tallinn-Tartu: The Research Group of Cultural and Literary Theory, 2010, 472 pp. [About Debora Vaarandi.] 
 "Teet Kallas's Tallinn". – Virve Sarapik, Kadri Tüür (eds), Koht ja paik/Place and Location III. Proceedings of the Estonian Academy of Arts 14. Tallinn: 2003, pp 379–393.
 "Estonian Literary Slum." – Virve Sarapik, Kadri Tüür, Mari Laanemets (eds), Koht ja paik/Place and Location II. Proceedings of the Estonian Academy of Arts 10. Tallinn: 2002, pp 389–406.
 "Über makkaronische Dichtungsart in Estland". – Proceedings of the Latvian Academy of Sciences; section A, no 4-5, 1996, pp 1–10.
 "Estnischsprachige Übersetzungsanthologien" – eine Auswahl. – Jynos Gulya, Norbert Lossau (eds), Anthologie und interkulturelle Rezeption. Opuscula Fenno-Ugrica Gottingensia Bd VI. Frankfurt am Main: 1994, pp 27–36.

References

1929 births
2013 deaths
Estonian literary scholars
Estonian literary critics
Estonian women critics
Recipients of the Order of the White Star, 5th Class
University of Tartu alumni
People from Väike-Maarja